The University of Münster (WWU) is a public research university located in the city of Münster, North Rhine-Westphalia in Germany.

With more than 43,000 students and over 120 fields of study in 15 departments, it is Germany's fifth largest university and one of the foremost centers of German intellectual life. The university offers a wide range of subjects across the sciences, social sciences and the humanities. Several courses are also taught in English, including PhD programmes as well as postgraduate courses in geoinformatics, geospational technologies or information systems.

Professors and former students have won ten Leibniz Prizes, the most prestigious as well as the best-funded prize in Europe, one Fields Medal and two Nobel Prizes. The WWU has also been successful in the German government's Excellence Initiative.

History
The university has its roots in the Münster's Jesuit College (Jesuiten-Kolleg Münster), founded in 1588, and the convent of lay sisters Liebfrauen-Überwasser, founded in 1040, of which it took its seal. The convent was dissolved in 1773, so that its funds could be used to found the University of Münster on 16 April 1780.

In 1631, Pope Urban VIII and Emperor Ferdinand II issued privileges, allowing the establishment of a university in Münster. However, due to a lack of funding, they were only put to use in 1780, when the modern University of Münster was founded with four faculties: Law, Medicine, Philosophy and Theology.

In 1843, it was renamed to Royal Theological and Philosophical Academy (Königliche Theologische und Philosophische Akademie), informally Münster Academy (Akademie Münster).

The ceremony of constitution was performed by Franz Freiherr von Fürstenberg. The university received its current name from Emperor Wilhelm II on 22 August 1907.

European degrees
1999 saw the beginning of the Bologna Process, which aimed to ensure comparability in the standards and quality of higher education qualifications. The Münster School of Business Administration and Economics was the first one to establish bachelor's and master's degrees.

In the winter semester 2006/2007 nearly all studies have been changed according to Bachelor/Master system. Exceptions are made in studies leading to the Staatsexamen in medicine, dentistry, pharmacy and law.

Rankings

The University of Münster is member of the association German U15 e.V. which is a coalition of fifteen major research-intensive and leading medical universities in Germany with a full disciplinary spectrum, excluding any defining engineering sciences.

The Leiden university ranking, ranks Münster as the third best German university in the size-independent ranking. Strong faculties include mathematics, chemistry, medicine and business studies. According to the Shanghai university ranking, the University of Münster is the fourth best German university for chemistry (46th best university for chemistry worldwide).

Two Max-Planck-Prize and five Gottfried-Wilhelm-Leibniz-Winner are currently professors at the faculty of mathematics.

Münster has been successful with two excellence cluster "Cells in Motion" and "Religion and Politics" in the German excellence initiative.

Organization

 Faculty of Protestant Theology
 Faculty of Catholic Theology
 Faculty of Law
 Faculty of Economics (Muenster School of Business Administration and Economics)
 Faculty of Health Science (Medicine and Dental Medicine)
 Faculty of Educational and Social Science
 Institute of Communication Science (IfK) (PR, Journalism, Media Science)
 Faculty of Psychology and Sport Science
 Faculty of History/Philosophy
 Faculty of Philology
 Faculty of Mathematics and Computer Science
 Faculty of Physics
 Faculty of Chemistry and Pharmacy
 Faculty of Biology
 Faculty of Earth Science
 Faculty of Music (Musikhochschule Münster)

Library
The central library of the university is the Universitäts- und Landesbibliothek Münster (ULB), which is also the regional library of Westphalia. As of 2011, the library owns more than 6.2 million volumes of which 2.68 million volumes are held in the ULB, while 3.53 million volumes are held by the 146 faculty and department libraries. Of those, 47,350 are electronical articles and newspapers.

Points of interest
 Botanischer Garten Münster, the university's historic botanical garden

Student life

The university offers a very active student life. The university's sports club ("Hochschulsport") offers more than 100 sport courses, sport tours, further education and international tournaments. The university's IT organization ("Zentrum für Informationsverarbeitung" (ZIV)) provides central services for information processing and communication technology. It offers IT facilities for the students with standard and special software. Foreign languages can be learned at the university's language center ("Sprachenzentrum"). It offers traditional language courses, tandem courses (two persons with different native languages meet in order to learn from each other) and language certificates (for example UNIcert). The cultural programme also includes various museums, music (choirs, ensembles, orchestra), theatres and cinemas. Student organisations such as AIESEC, AEGEE, move, MTP e.V. and many more are well represented with high membership.  The city of Münster itself has a very active night life with more than 1,000 bars and clubs. As the city of the Peace of Westphalia, Münster also has a very rich cultural life.

Notable alumni

See also
 Education in Germany
 List of early modern universities in Europe
 Muenster School of Business Administration and Economics
 Musikhochschule Münster
 CeNTech – Center for Nanotechnology
 European Research Center for Information Systems (ERCIS)
 Max Planck Institute for Molecular Biomedicine

References

External links
  

 
Culture in Münster
Educational institutions established in 1780
1780 establishments in the Holy Roman Empire
Universities and colleges in North Rhine-Westphalia